Vicki Benckert (born 17 October 1960) is a Swedish pop singer.

Vicki Benckert broke through in the Swedish Melodifestivalen 1984, where she had written three of the songs Kärleksmagi, Sankta Cecilia and Livet är som ett träd which she also performed. Of the 90 songs selected to participate in Melodifestivalen 1984, she wrote or performed in seven.

She also performed in the Schlagerfestival in Sopot, Poland, where she won three of four prizes for singing. She then performed in Moscow to an audience of 80,000. She was also one of many famous backing vocalists for Tommy Nilsson, for his song, "En Dag", which represented Sweden in the Eurovision Song Contest 1989.

She has also sung in the choir for Army of Lovers, Tomas Ledin, Niklas Strömstedt, Christer Sandelin, Tommy Körberg and Carola Häggkvist. She has toured the world with Roxette. Vicki still performs in the Stockholm Pride event, on keyboard, guitar and as a vocalist.

References

External links 

1960 births
Living people
Swedish pop singers